Skripchenko is a gender-neutral East Slavic surname. Notable people with the surname include:

Almira Skripchenko (born 1976), Moldovan-French chess player
Vadim Skripchenko (born 1975), Belarusian football coach and player

See also
 

East Slavic-language surnames